Against the Grain is the fifth album (and seventh release overall) by American punk rock band Bad Religion, released on November 23, 1990. It was the last album recorded with drummer Pete Finestone, who left in 1991 to concentrate with his new project The Fishermen. Following his departure, the band's music would take a different direction on their next album, 1992's Generator. Against the Grain was also the first Bad Religion album not to feature a lineup change from the previous two albums.

Despite no promotion by radio and television, Against the Grain managed to sell over 100,000 copies. A tiny part of the album's title track is played in a segment of the same name on The Dan Patrick Show.

Writing and recording
Writing and demoing for Against the Grain began in 1989, and Bad Religion entered Westbeach Recorders in May 1990 to record the album. Against the Grain is one of the few Bad Religion albums to feature songs not written by Greg Graffin or Brett Gurewitz. One song is written by bass player Jay Bentley alone, whereas another is co-written by Bentley and Greg Hetson.

Release and reception

Against the Grain was released shortly after the conclusion of the No Control tour which had lasted until the middle of 1990. The album was highly anticipated by both music critics and fans as a result of the band's success with their 1988 post-reunion album Suffer and its 1989 follow-up No Control. While Against the Grain still failed to break Bad Religion into mainstream audiences, it was the first 100,000 seller, and showed how quickly they were growing. By 1992, the album had sold approximately 90,000 copies.

The album has received generally favorable reviews in the years since its initial release. AllMusic's Johnny Loftus said that Against the Grain "found the band's edge honed sharper than it had been in years", and claimed that "Bad Religion had always warned against the excesses of the future and the assimilation of individuality. But the gospel cut deeper with Against the Grain. Songs began in an instant, with the single crack of a snare drum signaling the beginning of another screed."

The album's 13th track, "21st Century (Digital Boy)", was re-recorded and appeared as a single on their eighth full-length studio album Stranger Than Fiction, released in 1994, four years after the release of Against the Grain.

Album cover
The album cover of Against the Grain depicts rows of corn that, with the exception of one, bear right-facing, missile-tipped stalks. The lone ear of corn faces left.

Track listing

Personnel
 Greg Graffin – vocals
 Brett Gurewitz – guitar, backing vocals
 Greg Hetson – guitar
 Jay Bentley – bass guitar, backing vocals
 Pete Finestone – drums
 The Legendary Starbolt – mixing
 Karat Faye;- engineering
 Eddie Schreyer – mastering
 Joy Aoki – art direction

Release history

References

External links

Against the Grain (reissue) at YouTube (streamed copy where licensed)

Bad Religion albums
1990 albums
Epitaph Records albums